Lotti Fraser (born 18 June 1989) is an English actress and singer. Fraser studied Drama and English in London and Miami.

Career
She has appeared in the British children's television program Crisis Control, and appeared in the 2011 American comedy film The Hangover Part II. Fraser retired from acting in her mid-20s.

Since 2014, Fraser has become known for her philanthropic pursuits, with a particular interest in international development and human rights across Southeast Asia and Norfolk, England.

References

External links

1989 births
English television actresses
Living people